Esnandes is a commune in the Charente-Maritime department in the Nouvelle-Aquitaine region in southwestern France. Its inhabitants are known as Esnandais.

Geography
This small town north of La Rochelle faces the bay of Aiguillon (formerly Gulf Pictons). It situates on the cliffs overlooking the bays where mussels and oysters are produced which are still culminating to this day.

History
The first written mention of Esnandes dates to 920. In 1987, archaeological excavations traced the history of Esnandes thousands of years ago. Prehistoric sites, including a salt mine is behind an Esnandes church. The Roman occupation left traces in the form of a Roman villa at the Saint-Clement.

Esnandes is famous for its revamped church. In 1622, the Council of the City of La Rochelle ordered its destruction in place for a Catholic stronghold. Its main activity include mussel farming which date back to the 13th century.

The names of the trustees of the parish have come down to us:

1737: François Dugas, mussel farmer
1754: Mathurin Michelon, innkeeper
1754–1759: François Maudet
1759–1765: Jacques Blanchard, merchant, elected on August 19, 1759
1766: Jean-Baptiste Mesnard, merchant, elected on January 24, 1766
1781: Jacques Choyau
1782–1787: Jean Maudet, died on July 13, 1787, at age 56
1787–1789: Charles Valton, mussel farmer

Population

Administration

Esnandes is one of the 28 communes of the Communauté d'agglomération de La Rochelle (Community of agglomeration of La Rochelle). It is the intercommunality with the highest population in Charente-Maritime.

Esnandes is twinned with Thorens-Glières.

Economy

There are
23 aquaculture companies producing mussels with the brand name "Charron"
5 companies in the industry: 12 in construction, 6 shops, 8 services. 8 farms
a baker, a grocery store, a butcher / deli and a coffee shop / newspaper agent.
two doctors, a pharmacist, a dentist, a nurse and a physiotherapist.
1 post office

Religious heritage
The Priory of St. Martin or Church of St. Martin belonged to the Royal Abbey of Saint-Jean-d'Angély since 1029. The original building dates back to the eleventh and twelfth century but was rebuilt and restored in the fourteenth century. Since then, it has been modified several times. In 1840, the church was recognised as a historic monument.

To this date, it still retains its Romanesque style from the twelfth century, which is decorated and framed by two booths which form a complete set of reinforcements. The bell tower is square-shaped and pierced with narrow windows. A spiral staircase gives access to walkways equipped with aliasing, machicolations and bartizans. The east wall is pierced by three windows, a postern and a ditch were added to the defense later. The nave is vaulted with warheads based on columns and form three ships and five spans with flat bed. The two Gothic sacristies are both located behind the side altars.

Religious wars have caused extensive damage. After the fall of La Rochelle (28 October 1628), repairs began in 1629 and continued until 1740. Repairs carried out throughout the building as well as the nave's vault and the choir. The church was restored again starting in 1864 then coverage was repeated in 1996.

Cultural Heritage
'The House of Mussel Culture 'Mytiliculture'

Mussel farms collect approximately 10,000 tons of shellfish products (including mussels) per year from the Bay of Aiguillon, which has been producing shellfish since 1235. The mussel farms of Esnandes (Labellisée Musée de France) reflect the strong local heritage: understanding activity and environment, the House of Mussel Farms offers films, a dynamic and interactive museum and temporary exhibitions (or closely related themes on the region, environment, fisheries, cultural exhibits are conducted jointly with various associations of the township.)

Thus, young and old can follow Mollux, the mascot, throughout the visit (in the form of comics for children) to understand the biology of mold, its environment and its predators, and the production and marketing of the black pearl of our coasts. The coastal path called "customs" attract walkers.

Personalities
Guy lords and Amaury de Vivonne (crusades of 1129 and 1194) who became kings of Cyprus and Jerusalem.
The family of Alcide d'Orbigny, French zoologist lived in a house in Esnandes.
Georges Simenon's books which are often referred to Esnandes and its neighborhoods.

See also
Communes of the Charente-Maritime department

References

Bibliography
Publications de la Société d'Archéologie et d'histoire de L'Aunis.
Esnandes Village d'Aunis, Mme Lafon 1992.
L'Église Saint-Martin d'Esnandes, Mme Lafon 1987.
Essai pour une histoire de la cultures des moules en baie de l'Aiguillon, Jean Louis Mahé 1992.
Graffiti des XVIIe et XVIIIe siècles à Esnandes, Luc Bucherie 1980.

External links

Le Piéton d'Esnandes Photographies d'Esnandes

Communes of Charente-Maritime
Populated coastal places in France